"Wild Honey" is a song recorded by the American rock band the Beach Boys. Written by Brian Wilson and Mike Love, it was released as the lead single from their 1967 album Wild Honey, with the B-side of the single being "Wind Chimes". The single peaked at number 31 in the U.S. and number 29 in the U.K.

Composition
In a 1992 issue of Goldmine, Mike Love explained the idea for the lyrics of the song:

Recording
Recording for the song began on September 26, 1967 at Brian Wilson's home studio in Bel Air, California with Jim Lockert engineering the session. The song would be almost completely recorded in one day. The band would initially record organ and electric bass guitar courtesy of Bruce Johnston, percussion, tambourine and piano and following that Carl Wilson's lead vocal was overdubbed onto the basic track. The band then recorded instrumental inserts including bongos, percussion and drums, in which Dennis Wilson's bass drum was recorded in a hallway. The session then concluded with the band doing further vocal overdubs and Bruce Johnston performing the organ solo.

Work was resumed on the track the following day with Paul Tanner overdubbing his custom-built Electro-Theremin over the otherwise finished track.

Reception
Billboard described the single as an "easy rocker with a steady and solid dance beat."  Cash Box said  that it's "thumping, pulsing ditty."

Variations
The song was first released as a single on October 23, 1967. It was then released as the first track on Wild Honey in December of the same year. The following year, the song's backing track was released on the Stack-O-Tracks album. The song has appeared on several of the groups greatest hits compilations including the 1999 compilation album The Greatest Hits - Volume 2: 20 More Good Vibrations; the 2003 compilation Sounds of Summer: The Very Best of The Beach Boys as well as the 1993 box set Good Vibrations: Thirty Years of The Beach Boys.

Personnel
Credits per Craig Slowinski.

The Beach Boys
Al Jardine - backing vocals
Bruce Johnston - backing vocals, Farfisa organs, bass guitar
Mike Love - backing vocals
Brian Wilson - backing vocals, piano
Carl Wilson - lead & backing vocals, guitar, tambourine
Dennis Wilson - backing vocals, drums, bongos

Additional musician
Paul Tanner - Electro-Theremin

Charts

References

1967 singles
The Beach Boys songs
Songs written by Brian Wilson
Songs written by Mike Love
Song recordings produced by the Beach Boys
Capitol Records singles
1967 songs